Belknap is an unincorporated community in Wayne Township, Armstrong County, Pennsylvania, United States.

History
A post office called Belknap was established in 1855, and remained in operation until 1909. Belknap appears in the 1876 Atlas of Armstrong County, Pennsylvania.

References 

Unincorporated communities in Armstrong County, Pennsylvania
Unincorporated communities in Pennsylvania